Christmas Bloody Christmas is a 2022 American Christmas-themed  horror film directed and written by Joe Begos. It follows a robotic Santa Claus (Abraham Benrubi) who goes on a killing spree on Christmas Eve. Riley Dandy, Sam Delich, Jonah Ray Rodrigues, Dora Madison, Jeremy Gardner, Jeff Daniel also star. The film was released on December 9, 2022 and received mixed reviews from critics.

Plot 
The film starts with vignettes that resemble the typical Christmas advertisements, along with a news flash regarding a robotic Santa that's been recalled because of a certain malfunction that reverts it from its original programming from the US Defense Department. 

Record store owner Tori closes up her store for Christmas Eve night with her employee Robbie. Robbie, who is attracted to Tori, convinces her out of meeting with a date from Tinder and going out drinking with him. The pair meet with their friends Jay and Lahna who work at a nearby Toy store that is equipped with one of the defective Santa Clauses. The group drinks and hangs out before Tori and Robbie leave to go to a bar. The robot Santa malfunctions and becomes a violent killing machine, murdering Jay and Lahna while they have sex.

Charmed by Robbie, Tori invites him back to her house, unaware they are being stalked by the robot Santa. They arrive at Tori's house and continue to flirt before finally having sex. Meanwhile, the robot Santa breaks into Tori's neighbors' house and slaughters the entire family; with Tori witnessing the child's murder. As she panics and warns Robbie, she notices the robot Santa has spotted her. Tori wakes up her sister Liddy and Liddy's husband Mike and attempts to escape the house with them and Robbie. The robot Santa attacks the group, killing Liddy and Mike while Tori and Robbie escape into Robbie's car. As they attempt to drive away, they find themselves blocked by another one of Tori's neighbors who is quickly killed by robot Santa. Unable to escape, Robbie is dragged out and killed by the robot Santa.

A responding police officer arrives and manages to gun down the robot Santa for a moment before the robot Santa recovers and kills the officer. Tori runs over the robot Santa with the officer's car and drives away where she stumbles across more officers and an ambulance responding to the scene. Tori flags them down to help and tells them of the officer's death and is arrested by Sheriff Munroe. Back at the police station, Tori struggles to convince Munroe about the robot Santa. The robot Santa returns, having commandeered the ambulance, and attacks the station, killing Munroe and his partner. Tori retrieves a shotgun and fends off the robot Santa. She drives away in the ambulance, where the robot Santa climbs onboard and Tori crashes. Tori uses the crash to set the robot Santa alight, severely damaging it.

Retreating to her record store, Tori is hunted by the robot Santa who is now nearly fully stripped to its robotic endoskeleton. After being chased through the store, Tori manages to outwit the robot Santa and destroy it. An exhausted and bloody Tori leaves the store and collapses onto the street outside as Christmas morning begins and starts to laugh hysterically.

Cast 
 Riley Dandy as Tori Tooms
 Sam Delich as Robbie Reynolds
 Jonah Ray as Jay
 Dora Madison as Lahna
 Jeff Daniel Phillips as Sheriff Monroe
 Abraham Benrubi as Santa
 Jeremy Gardner as Officer Smith
 Graham Skipper as Mike
 Kansas Bowling as Liddy

Development 
Begos came up with the idea for Christmas Bloody Christmas while pitching a remake of 1984's Silent Night, Deadly Night, suggesting that the murders could be perpetrated by a Terminator-esque android. The pitch was rejected for straying too far from the original film, however Begos continued developing the idea and wrote the movie script during the COVID-19 pandemic. Actor Abraham Benrubi was chosen to portray the killer Santa as Begos did not want it performed by a stuntman due to the differences in physique. The movie was filmed in Placerville, California.

Release 
Christmas Bloody Christmas given a limited theatrical release on December 9, 2022, alongside its streaming premiere on Shudder.

Reception

Box office 
The film made $139,932 from 301 theaters in its opening weekend.

Critical response 
On Rotten Tomatoes, the film holds an approval rating of 75% based on 44 reviews, with an average rating of 6.2/10. The site's critics consensus reads: "Perhaps it isn't quite as much fun as a movie about a murderous robot Santa ought to be, but for fans of holiday horror, Christmas Bloody Christmas is still a gift."

References

External links 

 

2020s Christmas horror films
American Christmas horror films
2020s English-language films
2020s slasher films
2022 films
2022 horror films
2022 independent films